Neurogenic locus notch homolog protein 1 (Notch 1) is a protein encoded in humans by the NOTCH1 gene. Notch 1 is a single-pass transmembrane receptor.

Function 

This gene encodes a member of the Notch family. Members of this Type 1 transmembrane protein family share structural characteristics including an extracellular domain consisting of multiple epidermal growth factor-like (EGF) repeats, and an intracellular domain consisting of multiple, different domain types. Notch family members play a role in a variety of developmental processes by controlling cell fate decisions. The Notch signaling network is an evolutionarily conserved intercellular signaling pathway that regulates interactions between physically adjacent cells. In Drosophila, notch interaction with its cell-bound ligands (delta, serrate) establishes an intercellular signaling pathway that plays a key role in development. Homologues of the notch-ligands have also been identified in humans, but precise interactions between these ligands and the human notch homologues remain to be determined. This protein is cleaved in the trans-Golgi network, and presented on the cell surface as a heterodimer. This protein functions as a receptor for membrane bound ligands, and may play multiple roles during development.

A deficiency can be associated with bicuspid aortic valve.

There is evidence that activated Notch 1 and Notch 3 promote differentiation of progenitor cells into astroglia. Notch 1, when activated before birth, induces radial glia differentiation, but postnatally induces the differentiation into astrocytes. One study shows that Notch-1 cascade is activated by Reelin in an unidentified way. Reelin and Notch1 cooperate in the development of the dentate gyrus, according to another.

Interactions 

NOTCH1 has been shown to interact with:

 GSK3B, 
 Lck, 
 MAML1, 
 Mothers against decapentaplegic homolog 3 
 NFKB1, 
 NOV, 
 RBPJ, 
 SNW1, 
 Ubiquitin C, and
 YY1. 
 USP10.

References

Further reading

External links 
 
 NOTCH1